Judeo-communism may refer to two antisemitic canards:
 Jewish Bolshevism (Russia)
 Żydokomuna (Poland)

See also